Jan Serpenti (born 6 March 1945) is a Dutch racing cyclist. He rode in the 1970 Tour de France. He also won the 14th stage of the 1970 Vuelta a España.

Major results
1967
 1st Stage 5b Peace Race
1968
 3rd Ronde van Noord-Holland
1970
 1st Stage 14 Vuelta a España
1973
 2nd Omloop van de Fruitstreek

References

External links
 

1945 births
Living people
Dutch male cyclists
People from Bergen, North Holland
Dutch Vuelta a España stage winners
Cyclists from North Holland